How I Got Into College is a 1989 American romantic comedy film directed by Savage Steve Holland, starring Anthony Edwards, Corey Parker, and Lara Flynn Boyle and produced & released by 20th Century Fox. This is the film debut of eventual voice actor Tom Kenny, who would become best known as the voice of SpongeBob SquarePants.

Plot
The story follows a girl named Jessica (Lara Flynn Boyle) and her attempt to get into Ramsey College, a small college in Pennsylvania, and Marlon (Corey Parker), a boy who tries to get into Ramsey to pursue Jessica, whom he is in love with.

Cast
 Corey Parker as Marlon Browne
 Lara Flynn Boyle as Jessica Kailo
 Anthony Edwards as Kip Hammett
 Finn Carter as Nina Sachie
 Charles Rocket as Leo Whitman
 Christopher Rydell as Oliver
 Brian Doyle-Murray as Coach Evans
 O-Lan Jones as Sall O'Connor
 Tichina Arnold as Vera Cook
 Bruce Wagner as "A"
 Tom Kenny as "B"
 Bill Raymond as Flutter
 Philip Baker Hall as Dean Patterson
 Nicolas Coster as Dr. Phillip Jellinak Sr.
 Richard Jenkins as Bill Browne
 Phil Hartman as Bennedict
 Nora Dunn as Francine Bauer
 Duane Davis as Ronny "Sure Hands" Rawlson
 Diane Franklin as Sharon Browne
 Robert Ridgely as George Kailo
 Micole Mercurio as Betty Kailo
 Bill Henderson as Detroit High School Coach
 Richard Steven Horvitz as Young Energizer
 Curtis Armstrong as Arcadia Bible Academy Recruiter
 Taylor Negron as Mailman

Production
Jan Eliasberg started directing but was fired five days into filming and replaced with Savage Steve Holland.

Reception

Critical response 
The review aggregator website Rotten Tomatoes has rated it a 38%

Box office
The film was a box office bomb, making just $651,850 in its opening weekend from 743 theaters for an average of $877 per venue. It ended its run with only $1,642,239 domestically.

Production notes
Parts of the film usedin Claremont, California, as Ramsey College.

References

External links
 
 
 
 

1989 films
1989 romantic comedy films
20th Century Fox films
American romantic comedy films
American coming-of-age comedy films
Films shot in California
Films directed by Savage Steve Holland
1980s English-language films
1980s American films